Omar Kaboré (born 30 August 1993) is a Burkinabé footballer who plays for Lusaka Dynamos in Zambia having joined as free agent from CF Mounana.

Kaboré joined Egyptian Premier League side El Raja SC in September 2017.

References

External links 
 
 
 Omar Kaboré at Footballdatabase

1993 births
Living people
Association football forwards
Burkinabé footballers
Burkina Faso international footballers
African Games silver medalists for Burkina Faso
African Games medalists in football
Competitors at the 2015 African Games
21st-century Burkinabé people